= Steve Arveschoug =

American politician

Member of the Colorado House of Representatives from the 44th district
- In office January 11, 1989 – January 13, 1993
- Preceded by: Leo Jenkins
- Succeeded by: Robert Shoemaker

Personal details
- Party: Republican

Steve Arveschoug is an American politician who served in the Colorado House of Representatives from the 44th district from 1989 to 1993.
